We Need Each Other may refer to:

 We Need Each Other (album), 2008 album by Sanctus Real
 "We Need Each Other" (song), song from the album
 We Need Each Other (film), 1944 Swedish film